Harrow Hill is an archaeological site in West Sussex, England.

There is Neolithic flint mine, and a Martin Down style enclosure of the Bronze Age. The site is a scheduled monument.

Description

Flint mine
The southern part of the area, where there is hummocky ground, is thought to show a slightly different period of mining.

There had been some exploitation of upper levels of flint, and there were six radiating galleries at the bottom of the pit. Some galleries had engraved designs above the entrances, which may have been miners' tallies. An antler pick from a shaft has been radio-carbon dated to about 3710 BC.

Flint was mined probably for trading elsewhere.

Martin Down style enclosure
The Martin Down style enclosure, interpreted as a domestic settlement, is named after the Bronze Age enclosure on Martin Down in Hampshire. It is a rectangle aligned west–east, and at the north-east corner it partly overlies mine shafts on the southern side of the mining area.

It was partly excavated in 1936. Pottery sherds from about 600 BC were found, and skulls of 50 to 100 oxen. There was once a timber gateway at the entrance, and the bank had a timber palisade.

References

Hills of West Sussex
Scheduled monuments in West Sussex
Prehistoric mines
Bronze Age sites in West Sussex
Worthing